Lagrasse is a commune in the Aude department in the Occitanie region of Southern France. In 2016, it had a population of 560. Lagrasse is part of the Les Plus Beaux Villages de France ("The most beautiful villages of France") association.

Geography
It lies in the valley of the River Orbieu, at the foot of the Pyrenees.

History
Lagrasse dates from the time the abbey was built. Permission for the construction was given by Charlemagne in 783.

Population

Sights
The two highlights of the village are the eponymous Abbey and the bridges, although the narrow medieval streets of the village itself are also very attractive, and remains of the town walls can still be seen.

Economy
The region is renowned for the wine produced in the surrounding hills - this is the Corbières wine region, the largest wine-producing region in France.

The village is now home to numerous pottery workers and artists, and host numerous cultural and intellectual festivals such as "Le Banquet du Livre" and the "En Blanc et Noir: Festival International de Piano Robert Turnbull."

See also
Communes of the Aude department

References

Communes of Aude
Plus Beaux Villages de France
Aude communes articles needing translation from French Wikipedia